The Almena Diversion Dam is a reinforced concrete ogee overflow weir located 8 miles northeast of Norton, Kansas long the valley of Prairie Dog Creek and about 11 miles downstream of Norton Dam.

References 

Dams in Kansas
Geography of Norton County, Kansas